The City Assembly of the City of Zagreb is the lawmaking body of the Croatian capital of Zagreb. It consists of 47 members who were elected  by universal suffrage and secret ballot at 2017 elections for a term of four years. The assembly meets at the Old City Hall, close to the St. Mark's Square. This representative body passes acts within the self-governing scope of the City of Zagreb and performs other duties in accordance with the state laws and its own Statute. The assembly serves as a check against the mayor in a mayor-council government model. It has 24 permanent and occasional working bodies with oversight of various functions of the city government.

Assembly members
The assembly comprises 51 members elected in a general, free, secret and direct ballot by the citizens of Zagreb according to the principle of proportional representation. Elections take place every four years – at the same time as for the Mayor. According to the article 49 of the Statute of the City of Zagreb, "councilors perform they duty honorarily and do not receive a salary" but are entitled to compensation so according to the Decision on the Regular Financing of the Parties, male representatives annually receive around 56,000 kunas (cca. €7,545), and female representatives 62,000 kunas (cca. €8,355). However, this money is paid to the representatives' special giro account and can only be spent on the program of a political party or as a charitable donation. In addition, each of the 51 representatives receives 1,200 kunas (cca. €160) per month for work at the Assembly, regardless of whether they have attended Assembly meeting or not, and around 1,250 kunas (cca. €170) for the work in assembly committees (each representative is member of at least one committee).

Parties with at least three AM's or at least three independent AM's can form a councilors' club in order to organize and participate in the debates and committees of the assembly. City councilors of two or more political parties and independents are allowed to form a joint club. Others are part of the mixed group.

Organizational structure
Assembly is headed by a president and four deputy presidents who form the Presidency of the Assembly. The Secretariat of the Assembly is the professional Assembly service.

Permanent working bodies of the City Assembly are:

 Credentials Committee;
 Election and Appointment Committee;
 Statute, Rules of Procedure and Regulations Committee;
 Town, Street and Square Naming Committee;
 Economic Development Committee;
 Finance Committee;
 Utilities Management Committee;
 Physical Planning Committee;
 Committee for Environmental Protection;
 Agriculture, Forestry and Water Management Committee;
 Healthcare Committee;
 Social Welfare Committee;
 Education and Sports Committee;
 Culture Committee;
 Youth Committee;
 Intercity and International Cooperation Committee;
 Local Government Committee;
 Petitions and Appeals Committee.

Political structure
The political groups represented in the Assembly (as of June 2021):

References

Organizations based in Zagreb
Local government in Croatia